Colima can mean:

 Colima, a state of Mexico
 Colima City, the state capital of the same name
 Colima District, district in Tibas canton of San José Province (Costa Rica)
 Colima people, Pre-Hispanic Mexican people
 Colima (volcano), a mountain
 Colima (spider), an ant spider genus
 Colima, Georgia, a community in the United States
 Colima, a former genus of plants now placed in Tigridia